The Mississauga Tomahawks were a Junior "A" box lacrosse team from Mississauga, Ontario, Canada.  The Tomahawks played in the OLA Junior A Lacrosse League. Some former Tomahawks players who have gone on to professional lacrosse are John Tavares, Peter Tavares, Anthony Cosmo, Jeff Shatler, Drew Candy, Jamie McKeracher, Cory Leigh, John Rosa, Rob Kirkby, Ted Dowling, Mat Giles, Jason Clark, Neil Doddridge and Ted Dowling.

On June 26, 2014 the Board of Governors and the OLA Board of Directors approved the relocation of the Jr. A Tomahawks to Mimico, beginning in 2015.  This is a franchise amalgamation between the Jr. A Tomahawks and the Jr. B Mountaineers.  The Jr. B Tomahawks remain the direct affiliate of the Jr. A Mountaineers. Their women's affiliate team is the Mississauga Trilliums of the Ontario Women's Lacrosse.

History

Current franchise
Mississauga Athletics 19xx - 1974
Mississauga Sullivan Homes 1975 - 1976
Mississauga Merchants 1977 - 1979
Mississauga Arrowheads 1980 - 1984
Mississauga Tomahawks 1985 - 2014

Traditional franchise
Toronto Township PCO's 1965 - 1967
Mississauga Athletics 1968 - 1974
Mississauga Chiefs 1975 - 1976
Mississauga Builders 1977 - 1980
Mississauga Tomahawks 1981 - 1983

Current franchise season-by-season results
Note: GP = Games played, W = Wins, L = Losses, T = Ties, Pts = Points, GF = Goals for, GA = Goals against

Traditional franchise season-by-season results
Note: GP = Games played, W = Wins, L = Losses, T = Ties, Pts = Points, GF = Goals for, GA = Goals against

Mississauga Junior "C"
The Mississauga farm system also incorporated a Junior "C" team in the 1970s as a feeder team.

Mississauga Athletics 1973 - 1974
Mississauga Medics 1975 - 1977
Mississauga Renegades 1978

External links
Mississauga Tomahawks Jr. A Lacrosse Website
Mississauga Tomahawks Jr. B Lacrosse Website
Jr. A Lacrosse League Website
Ontario Lacrosse Association (OLA)

Ontario Lacrosse Association teams
Sport in Mississauga